The Argyle Street Waterworks Depot was a building of the Water Supplies Department located in Mong Kok, Yau Tsim Mong District, Hong Kong.

Location
The Argyle Street Waterworks Depot was located in Mong Kok, at the intersection of Argyle Street and Sai Yee Street, at No. 111 Argyle Street and No. 128 Sai Yee Street, near Mong Kok East station.

History
The Argyle Street Waterworks Depot was built in 1950. An additional three-storey block of offices was completed in 1954. One morning during the 1967 Hong Kong riots, 300 workers at the Argyle Street Waterworks Depot left their work at 9 am in a protest against the move to suspend 12 fellow workers.

The building housed the New Territories West (NTW) Regional Office of the Water Supplies Department. It was a depot-type office for the operation and maintenance staff and vehicles of the Water Supplies Department and its contractors. It served the "NTW region", covering Tsuen Wan, Kwai Chung, Tsing Yi, Yuen Long, Tuen Mun and Tin Shui Wai. The building also housed a small Water Resources Education Centre since the early 2010s.

The building was demolished in 2019. The WSD Mong Kok Office was relocated to WSD Tin Shui Wai Building at 20 Tin Pak Road, Tin Shui Wai.

Features
The building was built in Modernist style.

A section of the "Mongkok's Graffiti Wall of Fame" was painted on north eastern side of the building.

Future
The demolition site is managed by the Architectural Services Department. Two banyans that are around 50 to 70 years old, remain on the site. The redeveloped site also includes the area of the former FEHD Sai Yee Street Environmental Hygiene Offices-cum-vehicle Depot. The site is expected to be later sold for office and commercial development.

References

External links

 
 

Government buildings in Hong Kong
Demolished buildings and structures in Hong Kong
Water supply and sanitation in Hong Kong
Modernist architecture
Mong Kok
Buildings and structures demolished in 2019